Until 1 January 2007, Helsinge was a municipality (Danish, kommune) in Frederiksborg County on the north coast of the island of Zealand (Sjælland) in eastern Denmark. It had a total population of 19,473 (2005), but in the summer months the population grew to over 36.000 people.  Its last mayor was Claus Lange, a member of the Venstre (Liberal Party) political party. The main town and the site of its municipal council was the town of Helsinge.

Helsinge municipality ceased to exist as the result of Kommunalreformen ("The Municipality Reform" of 2007).  It was combined with  Græsted-Gilleleje municipality to form the new Gribskov municipality.  This created a municipality with an area of 278 km² and a total population of 40,409 (2005).  The new municipality belongs to Region Hovedstaden ("Capital Region").

See also 
 Helsinge, Denmark
 Helsinge railway station
 Holbo Herred

References 
 Municipal statistics: NetBorger Kommunefakta, delivered from KMD aka Kommunedata (Municipal Data)
 Municipal mergers and neighbors: Eniro new municipalities map

External links
Municipality's official website

Former municipalities of Denmark

de:Helsinge